Jakob Frans Oskar Wasastjerna (1819–1889) was a nineteenth-century Finnish-Swedish historian, genealogist and author.  He was the father of Karl Oskar Wasastjerna (1853–1923)

Publications
Tull-taxa för Storfurstendömet Finland å såväl import- som export-artiklar (1863)
Ättar-taflor öfver den på Finlands riddarhus introducerade adeln (1880)
Lifgardets finska skarpskyttebataljons officerare och civile tjenstemän (1887)

Finnish writers
Finnish genealogists
1819 births
1889 deaths